I liga Rugby is the second tier league for rugby union in Poland. Originally there were two divisions, consisting of 8 teams in the Rugby Ekstraliga and 6 in I liga, however as the sport is growing in popularity and more and more teams are being registered, third division has now been created, the II liga Rugby.

For victory, a team gets four points, two points for a tie and zero for a loss. There is an extra point for a team that loses by 7 points or less, and an extra point for scoring 4 or more tries in a game. In the event of a forfeit, the team unable to play will be docked 1 point and their opponent will be awarded a score of 25-0 and 5 points.

The champions are promoted to the Rugby Ekstraliga, and the last placed team are relegated to the II liga Rugby.

Current Teams 
Sparta Jarocin
Wataha Zielona Góra
Arka Rumia
AZS AWF Warszawa
Rugby Ruda Śląska
Legia Warszawa

Champions
2016-2017 - Orkan Sochaczew 
2015-2016 - Juvenia Krakow 
2014-2015 - Skra Warsaw 
2013-2014 - Skra Warsaw

Former teams

See also 
 Poland national rugby union team
 Rugby union in Poland

References

Rugby union leagues in Poland
Poland
1957 establishments in Poland
Sports leagues established in 1957